Deh-e Hoseyn Ali Khan (also Romanized as Deh-e Ḩoseyn ʿAlī Khān and Deh-e Ḩoseyn‘alī Khān; also known as Ḩoseyn-e ‘Alī Khān) is a village in Dust Mohammad Rural District, in the Central District of Hirmand County, Sistan and Baluchestan Province, Iran. At the 2006 census, its population was 453, in 89 families.

References 

Populated places in Hirmand County